Joe Santos (born Joseph John Minieri Jr.; June 9, 1931 – March 18, 2016) was an American film and television actor, best known as Sgt. Dennis Becker (later Lieutenant), the friend of James Garner's character on the NBC crime drama The Rockford Files.

Early  years
Santos was born in Brooklyn on June 9, 1931, the same day his father died. His mother Rose (née Sarno), sold olive oil and eventually became a nightclub owner and singer in New York City and Havana. She later married Puerto Rican-born Daniel Santos, and Joe took his name.

Santos was a football player at Fordham University, and even turned semi-pro, before finding a new avenue in acting. He struggled in show business, and worked blue-collar jobs until his friend Al Pacino helped him get a role in the 1971 movie The Panic in Needle Park.

In the Korean War, Santos served in the United States Army.

Career 

Santos had roles in a number of notable films of the early 1970s, including The Panic in Needle Park (1971), The Gang That Couldn't Shoot Straight (1971), as the leader of a slave-catching gang in the western The Legend of Ngr Charley (1972), Shaft's Big Score! (1972), as a policeman in Shamus (1973), The Friends of Eddie Coyle (1973), The Don Is Dead (1973), Blade (1973) and Zandy's Bride (1974). More than two decades later he appeared in the big budget Kevin Costner flop, The Postman (1997).

From 1974 to 1980, Santos played LAPD Sergeant (later Lieutenant) Dennis Becker, the friend of the easy-going, often flippant ex-convict-turned-private investigator Jim Rockford (played by James Garner) in The Rockford Files. He portrayed Lt. Frank Harper in the TV series Hardcastle and McCormick (1985–86). He reprised the Dennis Becker role in eight The Rockford Files television movies (1994-1999).

Santos appeared in various television movies during the 1970s and 1980s, including Nightside (1973), The Blue Knight (1973), The Girl on the Late, Late Show (1974), A Matter of Wife... and Death (1975), Power (1980), The Hustler of Muscle Beach (1980), The Selling of Vince D'Angelo (1983), and The Ratings Game (1984). His character was often a police detective or lieutenant. He portrayed Marty Sinatra, Frank's father, in the four-part 1992 television miniseries Sinatra.

In 1980, Santos played Norman Davis in the short-lived (10 episodes) NBC comedy Me and Maxx. In 1984, he portrayed Domingo Rivera on the ABC comedy a.k.a. Pablo, which was cancelled after six episodes.

From 1978 to 1980 he appeared on the CBS game show Match Game, always sitting in the top left seat. He appeared in numerous episodes and was usually a comic foil to Brett Somers.

Santos also appeared on The Sopranos as Angelo Garepe in seven 2004 episodes.

Personal life 
In 1958, Santos met and married Maria Montero while he was in Cuba. They were married 30 years until her death in 1988.

Death
Santos died on March 18, 2016, two days after suffering a heart attack at the age of 84.

Filmography

Television credits
 1973: Police Story Season 1 Episodes 12 - 13 "Countdown" — Detective Sally Pickel
 1974–1980: The Rockford Files — Sergeant (later Lieutenant) Becker (recurring), also in 8 subsequent TV-movies (1994-1999)
 1978: Black Sheep Squadron   — CPO Miller Timmons (one episode)
 1978-1980:  Match Game — Himself (multiple episodes)
 1974: Kung Fu Season 3 Episode 52 "A Lamb to the Slaughter" — Señor Sanjero
 1983:  The Greatest American Hero Season 3 Episode 8 "Space Ranger" — Henry Fletchner
 1984: Remington Steele — Alf Nussman
 1985–1986: Hardcastle and McCormick — Lt. Frank Harper
 1986–1987: MacGyver — Jimmy 'The Eraser' Kendall (two episodes)
 1986–1988: Magnum, P.I. — Police Lieutenant Nolan (five episodes)
 1988: Miami Vice — Oscar Carrere (one episode)
 1989: Quantum Leap  — Tony La Palma (one episode)
 12/05/90 Hunter - Season 7 Episode 10 "La Familia" - Ernesto/Grandpa
 1993: NYPD Blue — Angelo Marino (2 episodes)
 2004: The Sopranos — Consigliere Angelo Garepe (seven episodes)

References

External links

1931 births
2016 deaths
American male film actors
American male television actors
American people of Italian descent
Male actors from New York City
People from Brooklyn